Seth Gabriel Marton (born 4 January 1983), who performs by his stage name Seth Sentry, is an Australian hip hop recording artist. He has released one extended play and two studio albums. At the ARIA Music Awards of 2015 he won the ARIA Award for Best Urban Album for his second album, Strange New Past. Sentry's touring schedule has involved headline shows around Australia, as well as appearances at numerous festivals such as Breath of Life, Fat As Butter, Come Together, Sprung Festival, Big Day Out (Melbourne), Homebake, Hyperfest, Groovin the Moo and Triple J's One Night Stand.

Biography 
Seth Sentry was born as Seth Gabriel Marton in 1983. He grew up in Sorrento. Sentry's first public appearances were during live performances with Melbourne hip hop and drum and bass outfit, D.S.O.L. in 2003. In 2005 he reached third place in the Revolver Battles competition, in addition to organising and appearing in a weekly hip hop night at The Old Colonial venue in Fitzroy—Sentry's involvement with the Old Colonial led to an appearance on The Forthwrite Mixtape in 2007 and a guest appearance on Pez's 2008 album, A Mind of My Own.

After posting a number of songs on Triple J's Unearthed website, he was selected by Steph Hughes, host of the station's Home & Hosed programme, as a "Featured Artist". Sentry's "The Waitress Song" became the most downloaded track on the website and went on to reach No. 31 in Triple J's Hottest 100 of 2009 and appeared on the compilation The Best of Australian Hip Hop Vol. 1. "Simple Game", Sentry's second single, received high rotation on Triple J. He followed with a 31-date national tour supporting Pez.

In November 2008 Sentry independently released his debut EP, The Waiter Minute, consisting of five songs including his previously released singles. Accompanying the upload to Facebook of the conscious track "Strange Lot", he stated that he "wrote most of it in between train rides back and forth to work."

In 2010 Sentry continued to tour and finalised the recording of his debut album with Melbourne producer Matik. In August 2010 he was a guest on Horrorshow's "Our Song", ahead of a national tour with the group, and "Closer", a song by Australian hip hop artist 360.

Sentry's debut album This Was Tomorrow was released on 14 September 2012 on his label, High Score Records (distributed by Inertia Records). It was selected as the Triple J feature album in the week of its release. The album debuted at No. 6 on the ARIA Albums Chart and remained in the top 50 for six weeks. Two of its singles, "Dear Science" and "Float Away", were listed in Triple J's Hottest 100 of 2012 at No. 26 and No. 57, respectively.

In April 2013, Sentry performed on the American late-night talk show Jimmy Kimmel Live! singing "Dear Science" and "Float Away". In May 2013, Sentry completed the 'Dear Science' Australian tour, before announcing the larger 'Vacation' tour that featured support from Mantra and Grey Ghost.

On 5 June 2015 Sentry released his second studio album, Strange New Past, which peaked at No. 2 on the ARIA Albums Chart. It was also selected as Triple J's feature album. At the ARIA Music Awards of 2015 it won Best Urban Album.

In May 2021, Sentry announced his third studio album, Super Cool Tree House, which compiles songs released on YouTube during the COVID-19 pandemic. The album was released on 18 June 2021.

Personal life 
Marton grew up in Sorrento, a small coastal town in Victoria. His stage name was inspired by the Marvel comic book superhero Sentry. He is an avid gamer, sometimes referencing video games in his songs and posting YouTube videos in which he answers fan questions while playing video games.

Discography

Studio albums

Extended plays

Singles

Awards 
In 2012, Sentry won Channel V's Oz Artist of the Year award.

AIR Awards
The Australian Independent Record Awards (commonly known informally as AIR Awards) is an annual awards night to recognise, promote and celebrate the success of Australia's Independent Music sector.

|-
| rowspan="2"| AIR Awards of 2013
| himself
| Breakthrough Independent Artist
| 
|-
| This Was Tomorrow
| Best Independent Hip Hop/Urban Album
| 
|-

APRA Awards
The APRA Awards are held in Australia and New Zealand by the Australasian Performing Right Association to recognise songwriting skills, sales and airplay performance by its members annually.

! 
|-
| 2013 
| Seth Sentry
| Breakthrough Songwriter of the Year
| 
| 
|-
| 2016
| "1969"
| Song of the Year
| 
| 
|-

ARIA Music Awards
The ARIA Music Awards are annual awards, which recognises excellence, innovation, and achievement across all genres of Australian music. Sentry has won one award from two nominations.

|-
| rowspan="1"| 2013 ||This Was Tomorrow || Best Urban Album ||  
|-
| rowspan="1"| 2015 ||Strange New Past || Best Urban Album ||  
|-

J Award
The J Awards are an annual series of Australian music awards that were established by the Australian Broadcasting Corporation's youth-focused radio station Triple J. They commenced in 2005.

|-
| J Awards of 2009
|himself
| Unearthed Artist of the Year
| 
|-
| J Awards of 2015
| Strange New Past
| Australian Album of the Year
|

See also
Hilltop Hoods
Golden Era Records

References

External links

Official website

ARIA Award winners
Australian hip hop musicians
Australian male rappers
Living people
Musicians from Melbourne
Rappers from Melbourne
1983 births
People from Sorrento, Victoria